Pertiwi Cup is the main national women's football cup competition in Indonesia, thus the female counterpart to the Piala Indonesia. In the first three edition, the tournament name was Women's National Football Championship, before renamed to Pertiwi Cup in 2014.

List of finals

Performances

Awards

Top scorer

Best players

See also
Liga 1 Putri
Women's football in Indonesia

References

External links
Official website 

ASBWI website 

 
Indonesian
Indonesia
2006 establishments in Indonesia
Pert
Women's
Recurring sporting events established in 2006